Hallie Elizabeth Champlin Hyde Fenton (October 1, 1872 – December 19, 1935) was an American tennis player and painter.

Early life
Hallie Elizabeth Champlin was born October 1, 1872, in St. Louis, Missouri, the daughter of Henry Clay Champlin, a grain dealer, and Susan Isabella Hyde Champlin.

Tennis career
Champlin won the US Women's National Championship in women's doubles with Edith Parker, defeating opponents Marie Wimer and Myrtle McAteer in three straight sets.

In 1902 she won the doubles title at the Cincinnati tournament with Maud Banks against Winona Closterman and Carrie Neely, winning in straight sets.

Painting career 

Fenton studied at the Art Institute of Chicago, the Corcoran School of Art, Washington, D.C., and under Jacques Blanche in Paris.  She exhibited work from 1898 to the 1930s and won prizes at the 1907 Illinois State Fair.

Personal life 
In 1904, she married Edward Breckenridge Hyde.  He died in 1906.  In 1912, she married architect Warden H. Fenton.

Grand Slam finals

Doubles (1 title)

References

1872 births
1935 deaths
19th-century American women
19th-century female tennis players
American female tennis players
United States National champions (tennis)
Grand Slam (tennis) champions in women's doubles
Tennis people from Missouri
American women painters